This is a list of candidates for the 1858 New South Wales colonial election. The election was held from 13 January to 12 February 1858.

There was no recognisable party structure at this election.

Retiring Members
James Garland MLA (Lachlan and Lower Darling)
Richard Hargrave MLA (New England and Macleay)
Hovenden Hely MLA (Northumberland and Hunter)
Gideon Lang MLA (Liverpool Plains and Gwydir)
Patrick Leslie MLA (Moreton, Wide Bay, Burnett and Maranoa)
Henry Parker MLA (Parramatta)
Francis Rusden MLA (Liverpool Plains and Gwydir)
James Thompson MLA (St Vincent)

Legislative Assembly
Sitting members are shown in bold text. Successful candidates are highlighted.

Electorates are arranged chronologically from the day the poll was held. Because of the sequence of polling, some sitting members who were defeated in their constituencies were then able to contest other constituencies later in the polling period. On the second occasion, these members are shown in italic text.

See also
 Members of the New South Wales Legislative Assembly, 1858–1859

References
 

1858